The Pilatus SB-1 was a single-engined twin-propeller utility transport development project of Pilatus Flugzeugwerke AG from Switzerland, during World War II, (SB - Schweizer Bergflugzeug - Swiss mountain aircraft).

Design and development
The SB-1 was intended as a pure experimental aircraft, designed with a mid-wing monoplane with accommodation for pilot and observer side by side in the cockpit and two passengers in a cabin directly behind the cockpit. The fuselage was to have built-up from welded steel tube covered with light-alloy and fabric. The aircraft would have been powered by a single Argus As 10E / Argus As 410 air-cooled V-8 engine, located at the center of gravity, in the fuselage, below the wing centre-section. The engine drove two-bladed propellers, driven by V-belts and idlers, mounted on the wing leading-edges either side of the fuselage, reducing drag and imbuing favorable low-speed flight characteristics due to the air flow of the propellers acting directly on the leading edge of the wing. The SB-1 was designed with a fixed tail-wheel undercarriage and also had a twin-fin tail unit. A study was also made of two engines mounted in the fuselage, each driving  a separate propeller. Development of this project was abandoned before metal was cut.

Pilatus "SB" projects 
SB-1 Intended as a pure experimental aircraft, commercial use was not planned.
SB-2 Pelican The only SB project to be built and flown.
SB-5 An enlargement of the SB-2, abandoned before construction began.
 (Nothing is known about possible SB-3 or SB-4 designs).

Specifications (SB-1)

References

Further reading

1940s Swiss civil utility aircraft